Hot R&B/Hip-Hop Songs is a chart published by Billboard that ranks the top-performing songs in the United States in African-American-oriented musical genres; the chart has undergone various name changes since its launch in 1942 to reflect the evolution of such genres.  In 1982, the chart was published under the title Hot Soul Singles through the issue of Billboard dated June 19, and Black Singles thereafter, with an article in the June 26 issue of the magazine stating that the name change was based on the fact that "blacks  have been making and buying pop music of greater stylistic variety than the soul sound since the early 1970s".  During that year, 14 different singles topped the chart, based on playlists submitted by radio stations and surveys of retail sales outlets.  

In the issue of Billboard dated January 2, the number-one position was occupied by "Let's Groove" by Earth, Wind and Fire, the song's sixth week in the top spot.  The track remained at number one for two further weeks before being replaced by "Turn Your Love Around" by George Benson.  During the year, six acts reached number one on the listing for the first time, beginning with two consecutive chart-toppers in January and February, "I Can't Go For That (No Can Do)" by Daryl Hall & John Oates and "Call Me" by Skyy.  Richard "Dimples" Fields, Dazz Band, Jennifer Holliday, and Zapp also reached the top position for the first time.  Of the six acts who topped the chart in 1982 for the first time, only Skyy would achieve a second number one on the listing.  "I Can't Go For That (No Can Do)" also topped Billboards pop chart, the Hot 100, the only one of the year's soul/black chart-toppers to do so. In contrast, Fields' "If It Ain't One Thing, It's Another" only reached number 47 on the Hot 100, and "Dance Floor, Part 1" by Zapp did not enter the pop listing at all.   

Aretha Franklin, known as the "Queen of Soul", surpassed the record previously held by James Brown for the most number ones since black music sales and airplay were combined into one chart in 1958 when her single "Jump to It" reached the peak position in September; it was the singer's 18th number one on the listing.  The longest reign at the top during 1982 was nine weeks, achieved by "That Girl" by Stevie Wonder; it was Wonder's 14th number one on the chart and the longest-running of his career.  "Sexual Healing" by Marvin Gaye spent eight weeks at number one during the year but would extend its run to ten in early 1983, making it the longest-running number one on the chart since 1962.  It was the singer's first number one on the chart since 1977 and would prove to be his last before he was killed in 1984.

Chart history

References

Works cited

1982
1982 record charts
1982 in American music